Ahmed Nashid (born 4 April 1989) is a Maldivian footballer nicknamed "Naattey", who is currently playing for VB Addu FC.

International career
Nashid made his debut for the Maldives' senior team in a friendly match against Pakistan on 12 February 2013, coming on to play in the 65th minute, replacing Rilwan Waheed.

International goals
Scores and results list Maldives' goal tally first.

References

External links
 
 Ahmed Nashid at footballdatabase.eu
 ނާއްޓޭ އީގަލްސްއަށް ބަދަލުވެއްޖެ
 ނާއްޓޭ މާޒިޔާ އަށް
 ނާއްޓޭ ވިކްޓްރީއަށް

1989 births
Living people
Maldivian footballers
Maldives international footballers
Club Valencia players
United Victory players
Association football forwards
Club Eagles players